The 2009 Durham mayoral election was held on November 3, 2009 to elect the mayor of Durham, North Carolina. It saw the reelection of incumbent mayor Bill Bell.

Results

References 

Durham
Mayoral elections in Durham, North Carolina
Durham